Veerenni (Estonian for "Gutter", literally "Water Groove") is a subdistrict in the district of Kesklinn (Midtown), Tallinn, the capital of Estonia. It has a population of 3,769.

The City Arena Tallinn, an indoor adventure park, is located in Veerenni.

Gallery

References

Subdistricts of Tallinn
Kesklinn, Tallinn